The 2019 Upper Austria Ladies Linz was a women's tennis tournament played on indoor hard courts. It was the 33rd edition of the Linz Open, and part of the WTA International tournaments-category of the 2019 WTA Tour. It was held at the TipsArena Linz in Linz, Austria, from 7 to 13 October 2019.

Points and prize money

Point distribution

Prize money

1 Qualifiers prize money is also the Round of 32 prize money
* per team

Singles entrants

Seeds 

 Rankings as of September 30, 2019

Other entrants 
The following players received wildcards into the singles main draw:
  Kiki Bertens
  Julia Grabher
  Barbara Haas

The following players received entry from the qualifying draw:
  Misaki Doi 
  Anna-Lena Friedsam
  Tamara Korpatsch
  Laura Siegemund
  Nina Stojanović 
  Stefanie Vögele

The following players received entry as lucky losers:
  Ysaline Bonaventure
  Coco Gauff

Withdrawals 
Before the tournament
  Danielle Collins → replaced by  Anna Blinkova
  Camila Giorgi → replaced by  Jeļena Ostapenko
  Petra Kvitová → replaced by  Andrea Petkovic 
  Jessica Pegula → replaced by  Elena Rybakina
  Maria Sakkari → replaced by  Coco Gauff
  Anastasija Sevastova → replaced by  Ysaline Bonaventure
  Markéta Vondroušová → replaced by  Alison Van Uytvanck

Retirements 
  Alizé Cornet (right hip injury)
  Kateryna Kozlova (left lower leg injury)

Doubles entrants

Seeds 

1 Rankings as of September 30, 2019

Other entrants 
The following pairs received wildcards into the doubles main draw:
  Coco Gauff /  Caty McNally 
  Barbara Haas /  Xenia Knoll

The following pair received entry as alternates:
  Anna-Lena Friedsam /  Varvara Lepchenko

Withdrawals 
Before the tournament
  Kirsten Flipkens (left wrist injury)
  Anna-Lena Friedsam (right shoulder injury)

Champions

Singles 

  Coco Gauff def.  Jeļena Ostapenko, 6–3, 1–6, 6–2

Doubles 

 Barbora Krejčíková /  Kateřina Siniaková def.  Barbara Haas /  Xenia Knoll, 6–4, 6–3

References

External links 
 

2019 WTA Tour
2019
Upper Austria Ladies Linz
Upper Austria Ladies Linz
Generali